St Edward's School may refer to:

England
 St Edward's School, Cheltenham, Gloucestershire
 St Edward's School, Oxford
 St Edward's Church of England Comprehensive School, Romford, London
 St Edwards Catholic Junior School, Aylesbury, Buckingamshire

India
 St. Edward's School, Shimla, Himachal Pradesh

United States
 Saint Edward's School, Vero Beach, Florida
 St. Edward High School (Ohio), Lakewood, Ohio